The 2001 College Nationals was the 6th Women's College Nationals.  The College Nationals was a team handball tournament to determined the College National Champion from 2000 from the US.

Venues
The championship was played in Atlanta.

Final ranking
Source:

Awards
Source:

Top Scorers
Source:

References

External links
 Tournament Results archived

USA Team Handball College Nationals by year
Sports competitions in Atlanta